Henry Montagu, 1st Earl of Manchester (7 November 1642) was an English judge, politician and peer.

Life
He was the 3rd son of Edward Montagu of Boughton and grandson of Sir Edward Montagu, Lord Chief Justice of the King's Bench from 1539 to 1545, who was named by King Henry VIII one of the executors of his will, and governor to his son, Edward VI.

Henry was born at Boughton, Northamptonshire, about 1563.
He was educated at Christ's College, Cambridge, was admitted to Middle Temple on 6 November 1585 and was Called to the Bar on 9 June 1592. He was elected recorder of London in 1603, and in 1616 was made Chief Justice of the King's Bench, in which office it fell to him to pass sentence on Sir Walter Raleigh in October 1618.

In 1620, he was appointed Lord High Treasurer, being raised to the peerage as Viscount Mandeville and Baron Montagu of Kimbolton, Huntingdonshire. 
He became President of the Council in 1621, in which office he was continued by Charles I, who created him Earl of Manchester in 1626. 
In 1628, he became Lord Privy Seal, and in 1635 a commissioner of the treasury.

Although from the beginning of his public life in 1601, when he first entered Parliament, Manchester had inclined to the popular side in politics, he managed to retain to the end the favour of the King. He was a judge of the Star Chamber, and one of the most trusted councillors of Charles I. 
His loyalty, ability, and honesty were warmly praised by Clarendon. 
In conjunction with Coventry, the Lord Keeper, he pronounced an opinion in favour of the legality of ship money in 1634.

Family
Manchester was married three times: first, Catherine Spencer, daughter of Sir William Spencer of Yarnton, Oxfordshire; second, Anne Holliday (née Wincot), in 1613, daughter of William Wincot of Langham, Suffolk, and widow of Sir Leonard Holliday, third, Margaret Crouch, on 26 April 1620, daughter of John Crouch of Cornbury, Hertfordshire, who died in 1653.

He was succeeded by his eldest son, Edward Montagu, Viscount Mandeville, from his first marriage. The second son of Henry and Catherine was Walter Montagu, the courtier and abbot.

One of his sons by his third wife, Margaret Crouch, was George Montagu, father of Charles Montagu, created Earl of Halifax in 1699, and James Montagu, Attorney General from 1708 to 1710.

Notes

External links
Record for Henry Montagu, 1st Earl of Manchester on thepeerage
UK Parliamentary Archives, Papers of the Earls of Manchester

|-

|-

1560s births
1642 deaths
Lord High Treasurers
Lord-Lieutenants of Huntingdonshire
Lord chief justices of England and Wales
Henry Montagu, 1st Earl of Manchester
People from West Northamptonshire District
Alumni of Christ's College, Cambridge
English MPs 1593
English MPs 1597–1598
English MPs 1601
English MPs 1604–1611
English MPs 1614
Members of the Parliament of England for the City of London
16th-century English judges
16th-century English lawyers
Recorders of London
Earls of Manchester